Aglish is a small settlement in County Tipperary in Ireland. It is in the Civil parish and electoral division of Aglishcloghane  in the historical barony of Ormond Lower. It is located approximately 7 km  north of Borrisokane, 1 km  east of the R438 road.

The local Roman Catholic Church, St. Michael's (built 1893), is a limestone structure in a village composed of modest domestic buildings.

The previously disused old school, just to the east has been restored by an Operation Transformation group into a space for the local community.

The building of Aglish Church of Ireland was financed by the Board of First Fruits, it is listed (RPS Ref S9) as a protected structure.

References 

Towns and villages in County Tipperary